Oxetacaine (INN, also known as oxethazaine) is a potent local anesthetic. It is administered orally (usually in combination with an antacid) for the relief of pain associated with peptic ulcer disease or esophagitis. One example of such a product is Mucaine Gel, indicated for "rapid and effective relief in gastritis, esophagitis, hiatus hernia, heartburn of pregnancy and peptic ulcer". It is also used topically in the management of hemorrhoid pain. Oral oxetacaine preparations are available in several countries, including India, South Africa, Japan, Taiwan and Brazil, but not the United States. 
Unlike most local anesthetics, oxetacaine does not break down under strongly acidic conditions.

References

External links
Strocain Prescribing information from Eisai Co.

Local anesthetics
Acetamides
Primary alcohols